is a 2012 Japanese smartphone game developed by CyberAgent for iOS and Android devices. As of June 2014, it has over 5.3 million users. An anime television series produced by Silver Link aired in Japan between October and December 2014. There are also five manga adaptations based on the game, and a PlayStation Vita spin-off game was released in November 2015.

Gameplay
The game is a dating simulator which features over 100 different virtual girls, each with a unique voice actress. The player progresses their relationship with the virtual girlfriend by taking her on dates. The game is free-to-play, however the player pays real-world money to gain premium services. The game features various events that occur, including battle events when bad guys appear. The player can engage in club activities and school class events to solicit romance and increase intimacy with female students. There is a card-based system within the game, where the player collects different cards of varying rarity; each card has different attributes, such as attack and defense costs. Cards can be enhanced by engaging in a part-time job.

Characters

Main characters

A second-year high school student belonging to the rhythmic gymnastics club. She has shoulder-length brown hair and brown eyes. She is said to be the ace of the club and is extremely popular.

A second-year student in the school's broadcasting committee. She has red hair styled in a ponytail and brown eyes. She is a cheerful and kind girl. She has a rather close friendship with fellow club member Tomo Oshii.

A third-year student in the book committee. She has silvery-blue hair that is partly braided.

A third-year French exchange student in the Japanese Culture Research Society. She has long blonde hair and blue eyes.

A third-year student in the photography club. She also has long blonde hair but wears purple bows, and has green eyes. She is best friends with Fumio Murakami.

Other characters
: A third-year student and a member of the pottery club. Her grandfather runs a cake shop, where she becomes a part-time worker.
: A first-year student belonging to the Lacrosse Club. She has impressive reflexes and is always in a lively, cheerful mood, often making noise when everyone is gathered around. However, in reality she is lonely. She is Momoko's childhood friend.
: The president of the student council. She appears to be ditzy and sometimes unknowingly becomes a hindrance to other members, with her only known talent is serving tea. Due to her personality, her position as the president makes it questionable to other members.
: A second-year student who is a member of the Flower Arrangement Club.
: A third-year student who is a member of the Handicrafts Club.
: A second-year student belonging to the Literature Club.
: A third-year student belonging to the newspaper club.

: A second-year student who belongs to the Tennis Club.

: A second-year student belonging to the Light Music Club. She is the vocalist of the all-girls' band called "Neuron★Cream Soft", although she is also seen playing a guitar or composing music.
: A Japanese teacher.
: A second-year student and a member of the Robots Research Club. Unlike other students, she wears a rainbow-colored blazer. She also sparks an interest in Monochrome for being an android.
: A second–year student in the broadcasting committee. However, she prefers to work mostly behind the scenes, unlike her other club members, which explains why she hardly does any kind of open broadcast.

: A first-year student belonging to the Art Club. Loves fruits so much that she draws them in her paintings, with a desire to taste every kind in the world except for Durian which she dislikes the most.
: A first-year student who is a member of the Handicrafts Club.

: A Russian exchange student.
: A second-year student belonging to the Go Home Club.

: A second-year student belonging to the Light Music Club. She is the bassist of the all-girls' band "Neuron ★ Cream Soft."

: An original character designed by Yui Horie herself.

: A member of the Movie Study Group. She wears a green scarf around her neck in a similar manner to the Kamen Rider and likes tokusatsu films.

Related media

Print media
A manga adaptation illustrated by Tsukako Akina titled  began serialization in the September 2014 issue of ASCII Media Works's Dengeki Maoh magazine, released on July 26, 2014.

The first issue of the official Girl Friend Beta Magazine was released by ASCII Media Works on August 22, 2014, and four different manga series that cover specific characters began serialization in that issue. The first manga is illustrated by Takahiro Seguchi and is titled . The second manga is illustrated by Sawayoshi Azuma and is titled . The third manga is illustrated by Kakao and is titled . The fourth manga is illustrated by Na! and is titled .

Anime
An anime television series based on the original smartphone game was announced in June 2014, with an official announcement press conference taking place at the Akihabara UDX Theater. Produced by Silver Link, the series was directed by Naotaka Hayashi, with anime character designs by Noriko Tsutsumitani based on the original designs by QP:flapper, and story written by Michiko Yokote. The series began airing in Japan on TX Network (TV Tokyo) from October 13 to December 29, 2014. It was simulcasted by Crunchyroll.

An original net animation adaptation of Girl Friend Note, produced by Encourage Films, was released from October 14 to 21, 2016.

Other
 is a spin-off adventure visual novel game developed by CyberAgent and published by Bandai Namco Games for the PlayStation Vita, released on November 19, 2015. The game involves the player romantically interacting with eight different characters from the original smartphone game. Game features include Live2D character movements, binaural voices, touchscreen events and microphone voice communication, and involves an original story.

An Internet radio show began broadcasting weekly from October 8, 2013 onwards, hosted by voice actors involved in the game. A similar smartphone game targeted at females, titled , was released by the same developers.

 is a spin-off rhythm game developed by R-Force Entertainment and published by CyberAgent for Android and iOS. Released on December 1, 2015, the game underwent a two-week long maintenance due to unforeseen complications regarding various game systems. Maintenance ended on December 16, 2015 for Android and December 17, 2015 for iOS. It got a web anime adaptation in October 2016.

In July 2018, a stageshow will be held in Shinagawa Prince Hotel and the main cast is portrayed by the idol group , with an original character named .

Reception
There are over 5.3 million users of the smartphone game as of June 2014. Virtual currency expenditures within March 2014 were valued at 1.8 billion yen, accounting for over 40% of Ameba's entire smartphone division earnings.

During the New Year celebratory period in early 2014, a promotional commercial for the game featured a handful of character introductions, including the character ; her self-introduction became an Internet meme on Niconico due to her awkward-sounding speech. More than 100 parody remixes of the original video were created on Niconico, with some reaching over 660,000 hits within the few days following the initial release.

Footnotes

References

External links
 
Anime official website 

2012 video games
2014 Japanese television series endings
2016 anime ONAs
2014 manga
Anime television series based on video games
Android (operating system) games
ASCII Media Works manga
Bishōjo games
CyberAgent
Dating sims
Encourage Films
IOS games
Japan-exclusive video games
Manga based on video games
Moe anthropomorphism
PlayStation Vita games
Romance anime and manga
Romance video games
Seinen manga
School life in anime and manga
Silver Link
Social casual games
TV Tokyo original programming
Video games developed in Japan
Ameba (website)